Stéphane N'Guéma (born 20 November 1984) is a former Gabonese football player, who played as a winger.

Club career
Born in Gabon, N'Guéma made his senior debut for Rennes in the 2002–03 Ligue 1 season, after plying his trade for Rennes' reserve side, making a singular appearance in the 2000–01 season. In the 2005–06 season, he was loaned to Ligue 2 side FC Lorient. His contributions in that season helped Lorient to make a return to the top flight  after a long spell in the lower leagues. In the 2006–07 season, N'Guéma returned to Rennes, solely playing for their reserve side in the fourth tier, making 15 league appearances.

In 2007, N'Guéma signed for Istres, scoring eight goals in 33 appearances in the Championnat National. The following year, Paris FC signed N'Guéma, before releasing him in February 2009. N'Guéma proceeded to see out the rest of the 2008–09 season with Moldovan club Olimpia Bălţi.

Following the culmination of the 2010 Africa Cup of Nations, N'Guéma signed for Beauvais, scoring twice in 13 appearances in the second half of the 2009–10 Championnat National season. In July 2010, N'Guéma signed for Paris Saint-Germain II, making 19 league appearances, scoring six times.

In 2011, N'Guéma returned to his native Gabon, signing for US Bitam. N'Guéma's seven league goals in 11 appearances helped Bitam finish second in the Gabon Championnat National D1. The following year, N'Guéma signed for AC Bongoville, playing for the club for two seasons. In 2015, after a brief spell at O'MbiliaNzami, N'Guéma signed for FC 105 Libreville, spending three seasons at the club before retiring in 2018.

International career
On 15 November 2003, N'Guéma made his debut for Gabon, scoring twice in a World Cup qualification tie against Burundi. N'Guéma was included in the Gabonese squads for both the 2010 and 2012 Africa Cup of Nations, scoring against Niger in the latter tournament.

International goals
Scores and results list Gabon's goal tally first.

Post-playing career
Following his playing career, N'Guéma stepped into the role of secretary-general at the Gabonese players' union. In November 2021, N'Guéma and four other former Gabonese internationals were arrested "for protesting over the continued cancellation of the domestic leagues". N'Guéma subsequently stepped down as secretary-general.

References

External links
Stéphane N'Guéma's profile, stats & pics

1984 births
Living people
Association football forwards
Gabonese footballers
Gabon international footballers
2010 Africa Cup of Nations players
2012 Africa Cup of Nations players
Stade Rennais F.C. players
Sportspeople from Libreville
FC Lorient players
FC Istres players
Paris FC players
Ligue 1 players
Gabonese expatriate sportspeople in France
Ligue 2 players
Gabonese expatriate footballers
Expatriate footballers in France
CSF Bălți players
Expatriate footballers in Moldova
21st-century Gabonese people